Rotherham United Football Club, nicknamed The Millers, is a professional football club based in Rotherham, South Yorkshire, England, which compete in the . The club's colours were initially yellow and black, but changed to red and white around 1930. Since 2012 they have played home matches at the New York Stadium, having briefly moved to the Don Valley Stadium from their original home at Millmoor in 2008.

The club was formed as a merger between Rotherham County and Rotherham Town in 1925 and were immediately placed in the Football League. They won promotion as champions of the Third Division North in 1950–51 and were beaten finalists in the inaugural League Cup final in 1961, losing to Aston Villa 3–2 on aggregate. After seventeen seasons in the Second Division, relegations followed in 1968 and 1973. Promotion from the Fourth Division was secured in 1974–75 and the club went on to win the Third Division title in 1980–81. Relegations in 1983 and 1988 gave Rotherham the opportunity to win the Fourth Division title in 1988–89, though they had to win another promotion in 1991–92 following relegation the previous season. They beat Shrewsbury Town 2–1 in the 1996 final of the Football League Trophy.

Under the stewardship of Ronnie Moore, Rotherham secured back-to-back promotions in 1999–2000 and 2000–01. They stayed in the second tier for four seasons, though were relegated twice in three years by 2007. The club again secured back-to-back promotions, this time under Steve Evans, securing automatic promotion from League Two in 2012–13 and promotion from League One via the play-offs in 2013–14. The club have moved between the Championship and League One for six successive seasons between 2016–17 and 2021–22, winning the play-offs in 2018 as well as the 2022 EFL Trophy final.

History 

The club's roots go back to 1877, when the club was formed as Thornhill Football Club (later Thornhill United). George Cook was the trainer around this time. For many years the leading team in the area was Rotherham Town, who spent three seasons in the Football League while Thornhill United were still playing in the Sheffield & Hallamshire League. By the turn of the century, however, Town had resigned from the Football League and gone out of business; a new club of the same name later joined the Midland League. Meanwhile, Thornhill's fortunes were on the rise to the extent that in 1905 they laid claim to being the pre-eminent club in the town and changed their name to Rotherham County. For a period both clubs competed in the Midland League, finishing first and second in 1911–12.  Rotherham County became members of the second division of the Football league in 1919 whilst Rotherham Town failed to become elected to the third division northern section the following year. By 1925 County's fortunes had declined and they had to seek re-election to the third division. By this time it had become clear that to have two professional clubs in the town was not sustainable. Talks had begun in February 1925 and in early May the two clubs merged to form Rotherham United. Days later the reformed club was formally re-elected to the Football League under its new name.

The red and white kit was adopted around 1930 after playing in amber and black, but there was no improvement in the club's fortunes: in 1931 they again had to apply for re-election. Immediately after the Second World War things looked up. The Millers won the only post-war edition of the Football League Third Division North Cup in 1946 beating Chester 5–4 on aggregate. They then finished as runners-up three time in succession between 1947 and 1949 and then were champions of Division Three (North) in 1951. Rotherham reached their highest ever league position of third in the Football League Second Division in 1955, when only goal average denied them a place in the top flight after they finished level on points with champions Birmingham City and runners-up Luton Town. During that season they had notable results including a 6–1 win over Liverpool. In 1961 the Millers beat Aston Villa 2–0 at Millmoor in the inaugural League Cup final first leg; they lost the second leg 3–0 however at Villa Park. The second leg was played the season after due to Villa having a 'Congested Fixture List'. The club held on to its place in Division Two until 1968 and then went into a decline that took them down to Division Four in 1973. In 1975 they were promoted back to the Third Division finishing in the 3rd promotion spot in the Fourth Division. The Millers won the Division Three title in the 1980–81 season, and missed out on a second consecutive promotion by four points, finishing seventh In the second tier (then Division 2) 1981–82. They have not finished this high since. This season also saw Rotherham accomplish their highest-scoring second-tier league double, beating Chelsea 6–0 at home (31 October 1981) and 4–1 away at Stamford Bridge (20 March 1982).

During the 1990s Rotherham were promoted and relegated between the Football League's lowest two divisions and they slipped into the Fourth Division in 1991, just two years after being promoted, but reclaimed their status in the third tier (renamed Division Two for the 1992–93 season due to the launch of the FA Premier League) by finishing third in the Fourth Division in 1992. They survived at this level for five years, never looking like promotion contenders, before being relegated in 1997. In 1996 Rotherham United made their first trip to Wembley, beating Shrewsbury 2–1 to win the Football League Trophy, with two goals from Nigel Jemson giving Rotherham the win, with over 20,000 Rotherham United fans following them. In 1997, just after relegation to Division Three, Ronnie Moore took charge of Rotherham United. His first season ended in a mid-table finish and then his second in a play-off semi-final defeat on penalties to Leyton Orient. In 1999–2000 as Rotherham finished as Division Three runners-up and gained promotion to Division Two, where they finished runners-up and won a second successive promotion.

Rotherham managed to remain in Division One for four seasons, and after relegation to League One in 2005, Mick Harford took over as the Millers' manager, but was sacked after a run of 17 games without a win. Harford was replaced by youth team coach, Alan Knill. Early in 2006 it was announced that the club faced an uncertain future unless a funding gap in the region of £140,000 per month could be plugged. An intervention at the latest possible time by a consortium of local businessmen kept them in business. The final match of the 2005–06 season, home to Milton Keynes Dons, was a winner-take-all relegation showdown where a scoreless draw kept Rotherham up. Rotherham United began their second successive year in League One with a 10-point deficit as a result of the CVA which saved the club from liquidation. The club initially pulled the points back but, after losing key playmaker Lee Williamson and star striker Will Hoskins in the January transfer window, the Millers sat 13 points adrift of safety, making the threat of relegation inevitable. This resulted in Knill being sacked on 1 March, with Mark Robins becoming caretaker manager.

Robins's position was made permanent on 6 April 2007, but he was not able to save Rotherham from relegation. The Millers spent the majority of the 2007–08 season in the automatic promotion places but in mid-March 2008 it was revealed that Rotherham had again entered administration and would be deducted 10 points. Local businessman Tony Stewart then took over as chairman for the 2008–09 season and took the club out of administration via a Creditors Voluntary Agreement, resulting in a 17-point deduction. The Millers were subsequently forced to leave Millmoor, their home of over 100 years, for the Don Valley Stadium in Sheffield, after disputes with the landlords. The Millers had a successful season under the new regime, wiping out the point deficit and being in contention for a play-off place. Rotherham were also involved in two cup runs, reaching the Football League Trophy Northern Final and the League Cup last 16. This included victories over higher league opposition in the form of Wolverhampton Wanderers, Southampton, Sheffield Wednesday, Leicester City and Leeds United.

Mark Robins kept the majority of the team together from the 2008–09 campaign, whilst bolstering his squad with high calibre signings in the form of Nicky Law and the prolific goalscorer Adam Le Fondre. The 2009–10 season started well until Mark Robins controversially departed to rivals Barnsley in September, leaving the Millers at the top of the league. Former manager Ronnie Moore replaced him and led the club to their first ever play-off final and first trip to the new Wembley Stadium, where they lost 3–2 loss. In March 2011, following poor form he left Rotherham by mutual consent, and Andy Scott replaced him until he was sacked in March 2012. Steve Evans succeeded him, in the first season at the New York Stadium, and won promotion by finishing second in League Two. In the 2013–14 League One season, Rotherham gained a place in the League One play-offs, where they defeated Preston North End in the semi-finals to set up a second play-off final at Wembley Stadium in four years. In the final against Leyton Orient, the game went to a penalty shoot-out, where two saves from Adam Collin secured a second successive promotion for the club.

In the 2014–15 Championship season, Rotherham's first after a nine-year absence, their survival was jeopardised by a points deduction for fielding the ineligible Farrend Rawson during their home win against Brighton & Hove Albion, Farrend Rawson's loan had expired two days prior to the match, and despite the club insisting it was an external administrative error, they were subsequently thrown back into a relegation battle. However, safety was secured in the penultimate game of the season with a 2–1 home victory against Reading. Rotherham sold key players from their promotion winning campaigns before the 2015–16 season, including Ben Pringle, Craig Morgan and Kari Arnason. Evans left the club in September and former Leeds United manager Neil Redfearn was appointed as his replacement, being sacked in February 2016 after a run of six defeats in eight games. Neil Warnock was appointed as manager for the rest of the season, and the club stayed up, finishing 21st. Warnock left the club in May 2016 after not agreeing a contract extension. Alan Stubbs became the new Rotherham boss in June 2016, but was sacked in October. Rotherham replaced Stubbs with Kenny Jackett, who himself was replaced with Paul Warne, as Rotherham finished the season bottom of the league and were relegated to League One. 

At the first attempt, Rotherham returned to the Championship, defeating Shrewsbury in the 2018 play-off final.
Rotherham were relegated from the Championship the following season on the penultimate game of the campaign. The covid-19 pandemic struck during the 2019–20 season and cut short Rotherham's ambitions of being promoted the 'old fashioned way'. Their final game before the March 2020 lockdown was a 3–1 loss away at Rochdale. The Millers were eventually promoted through points per game in 2nd place behind Coventry City. Their return to the Championship was one which fans watched from home due to the persistence of the pandemic. However, despite the best efforts of the Millers, Rotherham would be relegated. Rotherham took the season to the final day where a victory would see them survive if Sheffield Wednesday and Derby County drew with each other. The draw did indeed occur, but Rotherham suffered an 88th minute equaliser against Cardiff City, which was enough to keep Derby in the Championship and Rotherham to be relegated to League One for the 2021–22 season. In the 2021–22 season, the Millers were promoted back to the Championship as runners-up, defeating Gillingham 2–0 on the final day of the season. The club also won the 2021–22 EFL Trophy at Wembley Stadium after defeating Sutton United 4–2 after extra time. Early in the 2022–23 season, manager Paul Warne departed for Derby County, being replaced by Exeter City boss Matt Taylor.

Kit and sponsorship 

Since 2015, the naming rights to the stadium are currently owned by local multimillion-pound company AESSEAL.

The club's principal sponsor is IPM Group and Asura which features on all the playing kits. The training wear has a separate sponsorship with Guardian Electrical appearing on all training and leisure wear. All kit is made by long term sponsor Puma which has worked with the club for over 10 years.

Stadium 

The club's traditional home was Millmoor in Rotherham where the team played from 1907 to 2008. On one side of the ground is the site of the new Main Stand which remains unfinished. It was hoped that the 4,500 capacity stand which is single tiered, all seated and covered, would be completed sometime during the 2006–07 season, but this had not come to fruition by the time the ground became disused in 2008. On the other side of the ground is the Millmoor Lane Stand, which has a mixture of covered and open seating. Roughly each section on this side is about a third of the length of the pitch. The covered seating in the middle of this stand looks quite distinctive, with several supporting pillars and an arched roof. Both ends are former terraces, with several supporting pillars and have now been made all seated. The larger of the two is the Tivoli End, which was used by home fans. It was noticeable that the pitch slopes up towards this end. The ground also benefits from a striking set of floodlights, the pylons of which are some of the tallest in the country at approximately 124 feet high. Following the failure of the owners of the club and the owners of Millmoor to reach a lease agreement the club left for the Don Valley Stadium in Sheffield in 2008.

Whilst a new purpose-built community stadium was being built in Rotherham, the club relocated to the Don Valley Stadium in nearby Sheffield for four seasons from 2008–09 to 2011–12.

In January 2010 the club announced that their new stadium, later named the AESSEAL New York Stadium, would be built on the former Guest and Chrimes foundry site in Rotherham town centre.
Preparation work on the site began in February 2010 to make way for the foundations to be put in place and for the old factory to be knocked down to make way for the stadium. Construction started in June 2011 and the first game played at the stadium was a pre-season match between Rotherham and Barnsley, held on 21 July 2012. The Millers won 2–1; the first goal in the stadium was scored by Jacob Mellis of Barnsley, and David Noble scored Rotherham's first goal in their new home. The New York Stadium made its league debut on 18 August 2012, in which Rotherham beat Burton Albion 3–0,
Daniel Nardiello scoring the first competitive goal in the ground.

Rivalries and supporters

Millers’ supporters consider Sheffield Wednesday to be the clubs main rival, Wednesday's  home ground - Hillsborough Stadium is the closest stadium to Rotherham United’s, The New York Stadium. 

Rotherham United also hold strong rivalries with fellow South Yorkshire clubs Doncaster Rovers and Sheffield United

Rotherham also have dislike to near side North Derbyshire club Chesterfield FC, with the rivalry between the Spireites and the Millers intensifying in the late 2000s and early 2010s. 

Rotherham have lesser rivalries with Barnsley FC and Bradford City.

In the TV series ChuckleVision, there are often references made to the club, whom the brothers support in real life. In "Football Heroes", Paul and Barry play for Rotherham after a mix-up with two former players of the club, Paul scores an own-goal and thinking it was a genuine goal, celebrates with Barry.

Records and statistics 

 Highest league finish: 3rd, 1954–55 Football League Second Division
 Best FA Cup performance: Fifth round, 1952–53, 1967–68
 Record league victory: 8–0 v. Oldham Athletic, Millmoor, Division 3 North, 26 May 1947
 Record cup victory: 6–0 v. Spennymoor United, FA Cup second round, 17 December 1977, v. Wolverhampton Wanderers, FA Cup first round, 16 November 1985, v. King's Lynn, FA Cup second round, 6 December 1997
 Record defeat: 1–11 v. Bradford City, Division 3 North, 25 August 1928
 Record home attendance at Millmoor: 25,170 v. Sheffield United, Football League Second Division, 13 December 1952
 Record home attendance at Don Valley Stadium: 7,082 v. Aldershot Town, Football League Two play-offs, 19 May 2010
 Record home attendance at the New York Stadium: 11,758 v. Sheffield United, Football League One, 7 September 2013
 Most played opponents in league and cup matches: Lincoln City (94), Doncaster Rovers (84), Crewe Alexandra (79), Bradford City (78), York City (78)
 Opponents with most victories against in league and cup matches: Lincoln City (49), Doncaster Rovers (40), Bradford City (37), Rochdale (36), Chester City (35)
 Opponents with most defeats against in league and cup matches: Chesterfield (41), Wrexham (31), Darlington (30), Walsall (29), Crewe Alexandra (29), Huddersfield Town (29)
 Opponents with most draws against in league and cup matches: Swansea City (25), Doncaster Rovers (22), Lincoln City (21), Walsall (21), Crewe Alexandra (20), York City (20)
 Record league points: 91, Division 2, 2000–01
 Record league goals: 114, Division 3 (N), 1946–47
 Record league goal-scorer: Gladstone Guest, 130 league goals, between 1946–1956
 Record cup goal-scorer: Alan Crawford, 18 goals, between 1974–1979
 Highest league scorer in a season: Wally Ardron, 38 goals, 1946/47
 Most goals in one match: Jack Shaw, 5 goals v. Darlington, FA Cup, 25 November 1950, won 7–2
 Most internationally capped player: Kári Árnason (36 caps for Iceland)
 Record appearances: Danny Williams, 461 league matches, 39 cup matches, 621 in total
 Youngest player: Kevin Eley, 16 years 71 days, 15 May 1984
 Record transfer fee: Freddie Ladapo from Plymouth Argyle
 Record fee received: £1,600,000 from Cardiff City for Danny Ward
 Record gate receipts: £106,182 v. Southampton, FA Cup third round, 16 January 2002

Players

Current squad
.

Out on loan

Club management

Coaching positions 

 Manager: Matt Taylor
 Assistant manager: Wayne Carlisle
 First Team coach: Jon Hill
 Goalkeeping coach: Scott Brown
 Head of Medical Services: Stephen Gilpin
 Head Physiotherapist: Mark Hoy
 Head of Talent ID: Rob Scott
 Chief Scout: Chris Trotter
 Lead Technical Scout: Warren Spalding
 Academy Manager: Richard Hairyes
 Academy Head of Coaching: John Williams
 Development Phase Lead coach: Rob Poulter
 Youth Phase Lead coach: Stuart Swift
 Foundation Phase Lead coach: Dave Atkinson
 Head of Academy Physiotherapy: Jessica Shaw
 Head of Academy Recruitment: Scott Duncanson

Managerial history

Board of directors and ownership 

 Chairman: Tony Stewart
 Vice-chairman: Richard Stewart 
 Chief Executive: Paul Douglas
 Operations Director: Julie Hunt
 Commercial Director: Steve Coakley
 Financial Director: Karen Thomas

Honours and achievements 

Football League Third Division / Third Division North / League One (3rd tier)
 Champions: 1950–51, 1980–81
2nd place promotion: 2000–01, 2019–20, 2021–22
 Play-off winners: 2013–14, 2017–18

Football League Fourth Division / League Two (4th tier)
 Champions : 1988–89
2nd place promotion: 1991–92, 1999–2000, 2012–13
3rd place promotion: 1974–75

Football League Cup
 Runners-up: 1960–61

Football League Trophy
 Winners: 1995–96, 2021–22

Football League Third Division North Cup
 Winners 1945–46

References

External links 

 Official website
 Past Players – biographies and appearance statistics, Official Site
 New York Stadium Progress Photos 
 New York Construction photos – MillersMAD
 Rotherham United's Play-off record

 
1925 establishments in England
Association football clubs established in 1925
Sport in Rotherham
Football clubs in South Yorkshire
Football clubs in England
Sheffield & Hallamshire County FA members
English Football League clubs
EFL Trophy winners
Companies that have entered administration in the United Kingdom